William Green (22 December 1950 – 21 August 2017) was an English professional football player and manager.

Born on 22 December 1950 in Newcastle upon Tyne, he attended St Mary's RC Boy's Technical School.

He joined Hartlepool United from school and made his league debut for them against Newport County in September 1969. He joined Carlisle United in July 1973 for £15,000, and then signed for West Ham United in June 1976 for £75,000. He later went on to play for Peterborough United, Chesterfield and Doncaster Rovers as a centre-half. He also managed Scunthorpe United from 1991 to 1993, with a record of played 101, won 43, lost 32, drawn 26. He lost his job after an expected promotion push in 1993 never happened. In 2002, he took caretaker charge of Sheffield Wednesday for one game, which they lost. He was the chief European Scout at Wigan Athletic and worked in a similar role at Derby County, alongside former Burton Albion manager Nigel Clough before being sacked in March 2009.

Death
Green died following a short illness, on 21 August 2017, aged 66

References

External links

Sven-Göran Eriksson fills key roles Leicester City backroom staff

1950 births
2017 deaths
Footballers from Newcastle upon Tyne
English footballers
Association football central defenders
Hartlepool United F.C. players
Carlisle United F.C. players
West Ham United F.C. players
Peterborough United F.C. players
Chesterfield F.C. players
Doncaster Rovers F.C. players
English football managers
Scunthorpe United F.C. managers
Sheffield Wednesday F.C. managers
Bolton Wanderers F.C. non-playing staff
Southampton F.C. non-playing staff
English Football League players
English Football League managers
Association football scouts